The Kirthar National Park is situated in the Kirthar Mountains in Jamshoro District in Sindh, Pakistan. Wildlife in the park comprises leopard, striped hyena, Indian wolves, honey badger, urial, chinkara gazelles and rare Sindh ibex. Blackbuck are kept in enclosures for a reintroduction project.

Species

Mammals
Total species: 33. Mammals in the park include
Asiatic wildcat, Felis lybica ornata
Caracal, Caracal caracal caracal
Indian wolf, Canis lupus pallipes
Golden jackal, Canis aureus persica
White-footed fox, Vulpes vulpes pusilla
Striped hyena, Hyaena hyaena hyaena
Indian grey mongoose, Urva edwardsii edwardsii
Honey badger, Mellivora capensis indica
Cairo spiny mouse, Acomys cahirinus
Sand-colored soft-furred rat, Millardia gleadowi
Indian bush rat, Golunda ellioti
Sind bat, Rhyneptesicus nasutus
Sindh ibex, Capra aegagrus blythi
Urial, Ovis vignei blanfordi
Chinkara, Gazella bennettii fuscifrons
Blackbuck (reintroduced), Antilope cervicapra
Arabian wolf, Canis lupus arabs
Indian pangolin, Manis crassicaudata
Jungle cat, Felis chaus
Indian hedgehog, Paraechinus micropus
Brandt's hedgehog, Paraechinus hypomelas
Indian crested porcupine, Hystrix indica

Birds
At least 147 species of birds have been recorded in Kirthar National Park. Species found the park include bearded vulture (winter migratory), Bonelli's eagle, imperial eagle, tawny eagle, golden eagle, griffon vulture, Egyptian vulture, cinereous vulture, laggar falcon, red-necked falcon, common kestrel, crowned sandgrouse, MacQueen's bustard, grey partridge, see-see partridge, white-tailed lapwing, chestnut-bellied sandgrouse, Lichtenstein's sandgrouse, painted sandgrouse, Indian eagle-owl, Sind woodpecker, hypocolius, Hume's wheatear, long-billed pipit, crested bunting, desert lark, hoopoe, grey-backed shrike, and Indian silverbill.

Reptiles
Reptiles found the park includes:
Indian python
Indian cobra
Russell's viper
Indian saw-scaled viper
Sind krait
Black copper rat snake
Indian star tortoise
Desert monitor
Yellow monitor
Mugger crocodile (possible extirpated)

Gallery

See also 
 List of national parks in Pakistan
 List of parks and gardens in Pakistan
 List of parks and gardens in Lahore
 List of parks and gardens in Karachi

References

External links 
 
 
 Kirthar National Park at Wildlife of Pakistan

National parks of Pakistan
Protected areas of Sindh
Jamshoro District